Evangelisch-lutherische Kirche may refer to:

 any of the Lutheran churches in German-speaking countries, in particular those which are members of the Evangelical Church in Germany
 the United Evangelical Lutheran Church of Germany, a subdivision of the former
 the Independent Evangelical-Lutheran Church, a confessional Lutheran church body of Germany independent of the above

See also
 Evangelical Lutheran Church (disambiguation)